Stanley Haidasz,  (March 4, 1923 – August 6, 2009) was a Canadian politician and doctor.

Life and career
Haidasz was born to Polish parents who immigrated to Canada in 1910 from Stanislawów.  He studied medicine graduating from the University of Toronto in 1951, and did post-graduate work in cardiology at the University of Chicago.

Haidasz entered politics when he ran in the 1957 election, and became the Liberal Member of Parliament (MP) for the Toronto riding of Trinity. He was defeated in the 1958 election in which John Diefenbaker led the Progressive Conservative Party to a landslide victory.

Haidasz returned to the House of Commons of Canada in the 1962 election, representing the Toronto riding of Parkdale. He retained his seat through five succeeding elections until 1978 when he became the first Canadian of Polish descent to be appointed to the Senate of Canada.

In 1964, he served as head of Canada's delegation to the World Food Program in Geneva, and as a delegate to the United Nations General Assembly.

He served as parliamentary secretary to a number of ministers in the 1960s. In 1972, he was appointed to the Cabinet as Canada's first Minister of State for multiculturalism and served in that position until 1974.

During his career, Haidasz was instrumental in the passage of Medicare, the Canada Pension Plan and Income Supplement, the Clean Air Act and other legislation. He also initiated the Anti-Smoking Tobacco Bill.

He retired from the Senate in 1998 upon reaching the mandatory retirement age of 75.

He was awarded a Commander Cross with Star of the Order of Merit of the Republic of Poland in 1998.

Books about Stanley Haidasz
Aleksandra Ziolkowska-Boehm "Senator Haidasz", Toronto 1983,; 
Aleksandra Ziolkowska-Boehm "Kanadyjski senator", Warszawa 1989, ; 
Aleksandra Ziolkowska-Boehm "Amerykanie z wyboru inni", Warszawa 1998, ; 
Aleksandra Ziolkowska-Boehm "The Roots Are Polish" Toronto 2004, ;
Aleksandra Ziolkowska-Boehm "Senator Stanley Haidasz A Statesman for All Canadians'', Montreal 2014, .

Archives 
There is a Stanley Haidasz fonds at Library and Archives Canada.

References

External links 
 
Globe and Mail: Canada's first multiculturalism minister dies

1923 births
2009 deaths
Canadian people of Polish descent
Canadian cardiologists
Canadian senators from Ontario
Commanders with Star of the Order of Merit of the Republic of Poland
Liberal Party of Canada MPs
Liberal Party of Canada senators
Members of the House of Commons of Canada from Ontario
Members of the King's Privy Council for Canada
Politicians from Toronto
University of Toronto alumni